"Hidden Away" is singer-songwriter Josh Groban's first single for his fifth studio album Illuminations.

Background
Josh and Dan Wilson both wrote the single. Josh also states it took three years to make his new album Illuminations. The song was also available for download on Josh's website. The song was available on his website a week before the official release on September 13. Josh also stated "after months of work, I can't wait to finally share this music with all of you."

Music video
The music video for the song was released on November 4, 2010.

Charts

Weekly charts

Year-end charts

Personnel
Vocals – Josh Groban
Guitar – Mat Sweeney, Smokey Hormel
Organ – Spooner Oldham
Piano – Josh Groban
Writers – Josh Groban, Dan Wilson
Producer – Rick Rubin

Release history

References

External links
Official website

2010 singles
Josh Groban songs
Song recordings produced by Rick Rubin
Music videos directed by Roman White
Songs written by Josh Groban
Songs written by Dan Wilson (musician)
2010 songs
Reprise Records singles